Wu Lin Feng, also known as WLF, is a martial arts competition televised by Henan Television. It is the longest running martial arts program in China.

Since 2007 the competition has become more international in nature, bringing in more challengers from other countries and filming bouts abroad, including in Germany, New Zealand and in the United States. Participants have included K-1 fighters, mixed martial arts professionals, Muay Thai fighters and wushu and sanda practitioners. In 2013, it was ranked among the top 100 most viewed satellite and cable television programs in China.

It has a partnership with Golden Fighter Championship (GFC) of Romania since 2017.

History

2017

In 2017 held the first “2017 WLF China-Canada Kickboxing Championship” on May 16, 2017.

2016

2016 Wu Lin Feng launched MMA events under the name E.P.I.C. which stood for Elimination Power In Cage. E.P.I.C was broadcast on Fridays at 21:20 on Henan Television in 2015 and 2016. In 2017 the events were renamed to W.A.R.S. which stands for Warriors arena of ruthless submission. In 2018 it was moved to be broadcast on Tuesdays.

2015

2015 Wu Lin Feng launched a new event called New Generation New Generation is a youth kickboxing tournament for the purpose of finding new talent.

List of events

Champions

WLF World Championship Champions

WLF World 8 Man Tournament Champions

WLF World Champion

WLF International Champion

Tournament results

2016 WLF World Championship Tournament −70 kg bracket 

(1) Nordin injured exit.

2016 WLF World 8 Man Tournament −67 kg bracket

2015 WLF World Championship Tournament −63 kg bracket

2015 WLF World Championship Tournament −67 kg bracket 

[1] Xu due to injury, Qiu substitute competition.

2015 WLF World 8 Man Tournament −67 kg bracket

2014 WLF World 8 Man Tournament −70 kg bracket

2012 WLF World 8 Man Tournament −70 kg bracket

References

External links 
Wu Lin Feng videos on iqiyi
Wu Lin Feng videos on Sohu

Television in China
Kickboxing organizations
Kickboxing in China
Sports organizations established in 2004
Shaolin Temple